McPherson Square is a square in downtown Washington, D.C. It is bound by K Street Northwest to the north, Vermont Avenue NW on the East, I Street NW on the south, and 15th Street NW on the West; it is one block northeast of Lafayette Park. It is the sister square of Farragut Square two blocks west. and is served by the McPherson Square station of the Washington Metro.

History
The park-like area is named after James B. McPherson, a major general who fought in the Union Army during the American Civil War before he was killed at the Battle of Atlanta. The Society of the Army of the Tennessee presented an equestrian statue of McPherson, which was erected at McPherson Square and dedicated on October 18, 1876. The sculpture represents McPherson surveying a battlefield. It was made by Louis Rebisso out of a captured cannon and rests on a granite pedestal.

Located in the central downtown commercial and business district, the square is frequented by area workers and street vendors, and restaurant-goers and the homeless at night. Owing to its proximity to the White House, it is also the site of political rallies and falls on the path of various protest marches. Adjacent buildings include the U.S. Department of Veterans Affairs, the Lafayette Building housing the Export-Import Bank, the 15th Street financial district, and numerous hotels.

The 2004 headquarters for Senator John Kerry's campaign for President was located in a building on McPherson Square.

On October 1, 2011, Occupy D.C. encamped in McPherson Square. On February 4, 2012, United States Park Police officers, citing no-camping statutes, evicted the occupiers.

References

External links

 Cartwright, Catherine. "Where in the District: McPherson Square," The Hoya, September 26, 2003.

Squares, plazas, and circles in Washington, D.C.
Downtown (Washington, D.C.)
History of Washington, D.C.